The Sheffield City Council election was held on 7 May 1964, with one third of the council up for election. The election campaign was quieter than most, with fewer parties contesting, and a smaller number of candidates than recent years (64 stood). The election seen no change in seats, and a slightly reduced turnout of 29%.

Election result

The result had the following consequences for the total number of seats on the Council after the elections:

Ward results

By-elections between 1964 and 1965

References

1964 English local elections
1964
1960s in Sheffield
May 1964 events in the United Kingdom